Puerto Rico Highway 35 (PR-35), also known as Avenida Manuel Fernández Juncos, is an urban road in San Juan, Puerto Rico.

Route description
It begins at Miramar, from the intersection of PR-1 (Expreso Luis Muñoz Rivera) and PR-26 (Expreso Román Baldorioty de Castro) to the PR-1 (Avenida Luis Muñoz Rivera), near Hato Rey. It is a road that runs parallel to the PR-25 (Avenida Juan Ponce de León). Among its intersections are PR-39 (Calle Cerra), PR-2 and PR-37.

Major intersections

See also

 List of highways numbered 35

References

External links
 

035
Roads in San Juan, Puerto Rico